Nicholas Stephen Leland Lyons (born 20 December 1958 at Dublin) is an Anglo-Irish financier, who serves as the 694th Lord Mayor of London for 2022–23.

Biography
The younger son of Dr Leland Lyons, FBA, FRSL, Provost of Trinity College, Dublin, descended from a cadet branch of the landed gentry Lyons family, formerly of Old Park, Belfast, he was educated at King's School, Canterbury, before going up to read history at Gonville and Caius College, Cambridge, graduating as BA (proceeding MA).

Lyons first worked as a political research assistant in London and then for the EEC Directorate-General for External Relations in Brussels, before joining Morgan Guaranty Trust Company of New York in London in 1982 where he worked for 12 years, then at Salomon Brothers from 1994 to 1995 and then moved with a team to Lehman Brothers where he worked from 1995 until 2003.

A Court Assistant of the Merchant Taylors' and Worshipful Company of Bakers' companies, Lyons was elected Lord Mayor of London, taking office on 11 November 2022. He was appointed KStJ in 2022 and awarded an Hon DLitt by City University in 2023. He is taking a sabbatical from being Chairman of Phoenix Group Holdings, the largest player in the UK retirement and long-term savings industry and a FTSE 100 company.

As Lord Mayor, Lyons seeks to build upon Charles Booth's pensions work by championing ‘Financing our Future’.

In 1986 Lyons married Felicity née Parker, by whom he has 4 children.

See also
 City of London
 Dr Leland Lyons

References

1958 births
Living people
Irish people of Ulster-Scottish descent
People from Kent
People from Norfolk
People educated at The King's School, Canterbury
Alumni of Gonville and Caius College, Cambridge
Irish financial businesspeople
British businesspeople in insurance
Councilmen and Aldermen of the City of London
Sheriffs of the City of London
Knights of Justice of the Order of St John
21st-century lord mayors of London
Deputy Lieutenants of Greater London